Taourirt is a province in the Oriental Region of Morocco. Its population in 2004 is 206,762 

The major cities and towns are:
 Debdou
 El Aioun Sidi Mellouk
 Taourirt

Subdivisions
The province is divided administratively into the following:

References

 
Taourirt